Sex Money Murder (also known as Sex Money Murda,  S.M.M. or  $.M.M.) is a Blood street gang operating on the East Coast of the United States. It was formed in the Soundview section of The Bronx in the Soundview Houses, a NYCHA development. It is one of the original sets (subgroups) of the United Blood Nation. S.M.M also has a chapter in Tucson, Arizona, as of 2014.

History
Sex, Money, Murder is a Bronx-based street organization that originated in the Soundview section of the Bronx, New York. After a Rikers Island stint where Peter Rollock aka Pistol Pete (born c. 1974) was locked up with UBN Leader it became sanctioned as one of the original UBN sets. UBN was started in Rikers Island and is the start of what became the New York/East Coast Bloods. The gang was fathered by Greg Stone aka "Grog", from the Soundview Houses, and Xavier a.k.a. "X" from Bronx River Houses, low income public housing development managed by the NYCHA.

Rollock was sentenced to life without parole and confined in the federal supermax prison in Florence, Colorado on a plea bargain for killing and committing to kill six people in the Stevenson Commons complex in the Soundview area. The terms of his plea bargain stipulate that he may be indefinitely held in segregation subject to special administrative measures which restrict communication. A model prisoner at Florence, his attempts to lessen these restrictions have been unsuccessful  due to fear by prosecutors that any suggestion he might make would be promptly carried out by S.M.M. members.

S.M.M. eventually  affiliated itself with the United Blood Nation, which emerged during the 1990s. Over a relatively short time S.M.M. spread to other locations. They are primarily located in the Soundview section of the Bronx, as well as the South Bronx and many eastern Brooklyn neighborhoods like Bedford-Stuyvesant, Brownsville, Crown Heights and East New York. On Long Island the gang is growing, it is particularly large in Roosevelt, New York, and to a lesser extent in Hempstead, New York, and Tucson, Arizona.  

During the summer of 2004, Tommy Thompson established the S.M.M. in Jersey City, New Jersey. On October 31, 2004, an 18-count Racketeer Influenced and Corrupt Organizations Act (RICO) indictment charged Thompson with one count of racketeering, encompassing specific and non-specific, robbery and robbery conspiracy, heroin and cocaine conspiracy and distribution. The indictment also charged Thompson with nine counts of violent crimes in aid of racketeering, including specific attempted murders, murder conspiracy, robberies and shootings; four counts of possession, use and carrying of a firearm for violent crime; one count of conspiracy to distribute cocaine and heroin, and one count of heroin distribution.

Thompson pleaded guilty on July 6, 2005, and admitted that he directed other members and associates of the Sex, Money, Murder set to commit acts of murder and assault - and took part in one of the assaults himself. He also specifically admitted directing the murder of a Jersey City man whom Thompson believed was cooperating with police against him and other gang members.

References

Organizations established in 1986
1986 establishments in New York (state)
Bloods sets
Gangs in New Jersey
Gangs in New York City
African-American history in New York City
Soundview, Bronx